Chestnut Mountain is a ski resort in Galena, Illinois. 

Chestnut Mountain can also refer to the following places in the United States:

 Chestnut Mountain, Georgia, an unincorporated community
 Chestnut Mountain (Caldwell County, North Carolina), a mountain
 Chestnut Mountain (Transylvania County, North Carolina), a mountain

See also
 Little Chestnut Mountain, a mountain in North Carolina